This is a list of Country Music Association Awards ceremonies and the winners in each ceremony.

Ceremonies
Below is a list of ceremonies, the years the ceremonies were held, their hosts, the television networks that aired them, and their locations.

Most wins and nominations 
Below is a list of most wins and most nominations received by an artist each ceremony.

Won four main awards in single year 
Only two artists have won the top four awards in a single year: Entertainer of the Year, Album of the Year, Male Vocalist/Female Vocalist/Group/Duo of the Year and Song of the Year: Vince Gill, in 1993 and Alan Jackson, in 2002.

Controversies

Categorical winners
Below is a list of winners in the major categories by year.

1960s

1967 

1968 

1969

1970s
1970 

1971 

1972 

1973 

1974 

1975 

1976 

1977 

1978 

1979

1980s

1980

1981 

1982 

1983

1984 

1985 

1986 

1987 

1988 

1989

1990s

1990 

1991 

1992 

1993 

1994 

1995 

1996 

1997 

1998 

1999

2000s
2000 

2001 

2002 

2003 

2004 

2005 

2006

2007

2008

2009

2010s
2010

2011

2012

2013

2014

2015

2016
 Main Article: 50th Annual Country Music Association Awards

2017
 Main Article: 51st Annual Country Music Association Awards

2018
 Main Article: 52nd Annual Country Music Association Awards

2019
 Main Article: 53rd Annual Country Music Association Awards

2020s
2020

2021

See also
List of Academy of Country Music Awards ceremonies

References

External links
Official site of the CMA Awards

American music awards
Music-related lists

Lists of award ceremonies